Secretary of the Expediency Discernment Council and former Chief Commander of the Sepah Mohsen Rezaee launched his campaign in June 2010 for the 2013 Iranian presidential election after losing in the previous election. Rezaee made the announcement that he would run for President on 16 October 2012. He was the candidate of the Moderation and Development Party, a conservative party. He was also supported by Green Party of Iran. He lost the election, receiving 3,884,412 votes and ranking fourth behind winner Hassan Rouhani, runner-up Mohammad Bagher Ghalibaf and Saeed Jalili.

Background

2005 and 2009 nomination 
Rezaee was a candidate of the presidential election of 2005, but withdrew on 15 June 2005, only two days before the election. He mentioned he was withdrawing from the race for "the integration of the votes of the nation" and "their effectiveness". He did not endorse any candidate. On 23 April 2009, he announced that he had entered the 2009 presidential race, after trying to find another conservative to run against President Ahmadinejad; he lost.

Positions 
Rezaee was a military commander during Iran–Iraq War and also became chief of Sepah (Iran's second army) after the assassination of Mostafa Chamran. He held this position until 1997 when he announced his retirement from all military services. After that, he became a member of Expediency Discernment Council and also its secretary after six months. Tabnak, a news website, is close to him.

Early stages 
Rezaee was one of the candidates who began his campaign just months after the 2009 election. His campaign headquarters was begun in early 2010.

Announcement 
Mohsen Rezaee announced he would run for the presidency on 16 October 2012 during a trip to Tabriz.

Headquarters 
The campaign was based in Tehran in Tajrish street, in a blue twelve-floor tower.

Political platform 
His major goal was about economics. He had a federalism platform and said he would do the same as People's Republic of China and Turkey had done in their economics. He also proposed green subsidies for farmers. He also had packages for resolving problems in foreign affairs relations and for the nuclear program of Iran.

Potential vice presidents and cabinet members 
He said that he would install a woman as head of the Central Bank and a famous economist as his Minister of Finance. He also said he would use Sunni Muslims in his cabinet.

Polls 
His chance in the polls was high before the candidates registered. After the nomination of other conservative candidates like Mohammad-Bagher Ghalibaf and Saeed Jalili, Rezaee's chance became lower.

Endorsements 

Actors, singers and sportspersons
 Yadollah Akbari
 Arash Miresmaeili
 Iman Mobali
 Vahid Shamsaei
 Mojtaba Jabbari
 Ali Nazari Juybari
 Javad Zarincheh
 Morteza Kermani Moghaddam
 Parviz Mazloomi
 Amir Ghalenoei

Politicians
 Ali Akbar Salehi
 Reza Ostadi
 Ali Movahedi-Kermani

See also 
 Moderation and Development Party
 Iranian presidential election, 2013

References

External links 
  
 (Tabnak English)

2013 Iranian presidential election
Election campaigns in Iran